Tom Gilmartin may refer to:

 Tom Gilmartin (businessman) (1935–2013), Irish businessman, whistleblower and pivotal Mahon Tribunal witness
 Tom Gilmartin (politician) (1924–2012), American politician

See also
 Thomas Gilmartin (1861–1939), Irish Roman Catholic archbishop